In 2022, an Internet meme appeared according to which the Czech Republic had annexed Kaliningrad Oblast in Russia. This new Czech province was referred to as the Královec Region.

On 27 September, the Czech satirical website  made a petition for the Czech Republic to send soldiers to Kaliningrad Oblast, hold an annexation referendum that would have a 98% vote in favor, and make the region a formal part of the country renamed as Královec, thus gaining access to the sea. This was in response to the annexation referendums in Russian-occupied Ukraine and the subsequent annexation of Donetsk, Kherson, Luhansk and Zaporizhzhia oblasts by Russia during its invasion of Ukraine.

Satirical calls for Czech annexation also extended to Franz Josef Land, an Arctic archipelago discovered during an expedition by a group including Czech individuals on 1873. It was named after Franz Joseph I, the Emperor-King of Austria-Hungary, the state to which the Czech Republic belonged to back then.

Various official figures and entities, including Jana Černochová (Czech Minister of Defence), Zuzana Čaputová (President of Slovakia) and the Embassy of the United States in Prague (as a followup to the planned F-35 acquisition by the Czech Republic) made satirical comments regarding the movement on Twitter.

On 10 October 2022, a few hundred people attended a mock referendum to perform the annexation of the region in front of the Embassy of Russia in Prague.

The predominantly German crusaders did so out of pride of accompanying such an important person as the King of Bohemia, who was moreover a respected person in the Holy Roman Empire of which Bohemia was part, as his mother belonged to the prominent Hohenstaufen noble family.

References

External links
 , a satirical tourist website portraying Kaliningrad as a Czech city
 , a satirical Twitter account

2022 in the Czech Republic
Internet trolling
Internet memes related to the 2022 Russian invasion of Ukraine
Kaliningrad Oblast